Juan Guillermo Domínguez Cabezas "Carachito" (born 17 December 1986) is a Colombian footballer who currently plays as a left back for Categoría Primera A club Millonarios, on loan from Atlético Junior.

He also is the younger brother of former Switzerland's FC Sion and Colombia national football team player Álvaro "Caracho" Domínguez.

Honours

Club
Deportivo Cali
 Torneo Finalización (1): 2005
 Copa Colombia (1): 2010
Junior
 Copa Colombia (1): 2015

External links
 Juan Domínguez at Football-Lineups
 
 

1986 births
Living people
Colombian footballers
Colombian expatriate footballers
Deportivo Cali footballers
Real Cartagena footballers
Millonarios F.C. players
Estudiantes de La Plata footballers
Newell's Old Boys footballers
Colo-Colo footballers
Atlético Junior footballers
Categoría Primera A players
Chilean Primera División players
Argentine Primera División players
Expatriate footballers in Chile
Expatriate footballers in Argentina
Colombian expatriate sportspeople in Chile
Colombian expatriate sportspeople in Argentina
Association football defenders
Sportspeople from Valle del Cauca Department